Rapsista (Greek: Ραψίστα) may refer to:
Rapsista, Ioannina
Rapsista, Thessaly